Wilson Park or variant, may refer to:

 Wilson State Park, MI, USA
 Wilson State Park (Kansas), USA
 Wilson-Tuscarora State Park, NY, USA
 Wilson Mountain Reservation, MA, USA
 Justin P. Wilson Cumberland Trail State Park, TN, USA
 Wilson Woods Park, Westchester, NY, USA
 Wilson Commons Park, NV, USA
 Wilson Park, Baltimore, MD, USA
 Wilson Park, Philadelphia, PA, USA
 Wilson Park Historic District, Fayetteville, AR, USA
 Maryon Wilson Park, Greenwich, England, UK
 Wilson Botanic Park, Berwick, VIC, Australia
 Wilsons Promontory National Park, Australia
 Wilsons Promontory Marine National Park, Australia
 Ethel F. Wilson Memorial Provincial Park, BC, Canada
 Wilson Botanic Garden, Costa Rica

See also 

 Wilson's Creek National Battlefield Park, MI, USA